Zolotanka is a rural locality (a settlement) in Krasnovishersky District, Perm Krai, Russia. The population was 78 as of 2010. There are 3 streets.

Geography 
Zolotanka is located 114 km east of Krasnovishersk (the district's administrative centre) by road. Ust-Uls is the nearest rural locality.

References 

Rural localities in Krasnovishersky District